Minolops cinerea is a species of sea snail, a marine gastropod mollusk in the family Solariellidae.

Description
The height of the shell attains 6.75 mm, its diameter 6.5 mm. The shining shell has a roundly turbinate shape. It is grey, painted above with closely set transverse bands of greyish brown. The 6½ whorls are flattened above. The sculpture and the colouring is complicated and it is very difficult to give anything like an adequate description. The whorls are sculptured with a number of beaded carinae, increasing to four on the body whorl. The space above these are occupied by two spiral beaded riblets, a third also occurring between the first and second carinae. The sutures are impressed. The base of shell is sculptured with two spiral grooves and a number of very fine spiral striae. It is painted with a zone of fine, closely set cinereous flammules, within which is a second zone almost uniformly of the same colour. The umbilicus is whitish, wide, deep, and bears several small, indistinct, spiral, crenate riblets. The outer margin is surrounded by a coarsely crenulate carina. The columella is somewhat angularly arched above, descending obliquely and terminating rather abruptly. The peristome is acute. The aperture is subquadrate.

Distribution
This marine species is endemic to Australia and occurs off Queensland.

References

External links

cinerea
Gastropods of Australia
Gastropods described in 1909